Thomas Shelmerdine (1845–1921) was an English architect and surveyor who spent most of his career as the land steward and surveyor to the Corporation of Liverpool.  In this role he was involved with many projects in the city, including slum clearance. public housing and road widening.  Shelmerdine also designed public buildings including hospitals, offices, fire stations, a fish market, schools, and libraries.  At least five of his branch libraries have survived and are designated as listed buildings by English Heritage.  His most highly regarded works are the Hornby Library within Liverpool Central Library, which is listed at Grade II*, and enlarging the council chamber at Liverpool Town Hall.  He was also responsible for laying out St John's Gardens.  Shelmerdine's designs include a number of architectural styles, including Italian Renaissance, Baroque, and Arts and Crafts.

Key

Major extant architectural works

References
Citations

Sources

Shelmerdine, Thomas